Dragan Marković (born 2 May 1960), commonly known as Palma ("palm tree"), is a Serbian businessman, politician and entrepreneur. He currently serves as a member of the National Assembly of Serbia and is a founder and the party leader of United Serbia (Jedinstvena Srbija).

He was the mayor of Jagodina from 2004 until 2012. In February 2001, he was appointed Deputy Minister of Agriculture, Forestry and Water Management in the first post-Milošević government of Serbia.

Controversies 
Due to public statements against the LGBT population, Markovic was sentenced by the First Basic Court in Belgrade in November 2011 for "severe discrimination", defined as "inciting and inciting inequality, hatred and intolerance based on sexual orientation".

On 19 April 2021, vice president of the Party of Freedom And Justice, Marinika Tepić, accused Palma and his partners for "prostitution of women and girls" in Jagodina. Tepić also revealed a video of the testimony of an anonymous man who is informed of the prostitution case. In the video he explained how everything was organized, who knew everything about cheating minors and which government members attended parties where prostitution was happening, claiming that all of this was happening in Hotel Končarevo whose "real owner" is Palma. Palma responded to these claims by calling them "lies" and announced that he will sue Tepić. Prosecutors announced that they would investigate the claims. On 23 April 2021, rector of the Megatrend University, Mića Jovanović, stated that he was a present at a party where Palma "prostituted girls between the ages of 18 and 20 to state and municipal officials".

References

External links 
 DRAGAN D. MARKOVIC, National Assembly of Serbia

Living people
Politicians from Jagodina
United Serbia politicians
1960 births
Mayors of places in Serbia
Members of the National Assembly (Serbia)